The IMOCA 60 Class yacht Estrella Damm was designed by Farr Yacht Design and launched in the 2007 after being built by Offshore Challenges who are not a boatbuilder (they run campaigns and events and were responsible for supporting Ellen McArthur) but brought in specialist to build the boat in Cowes on the Isle of Wight in England. Not to be confused with Estrella Damm 2 which competed in the 2010 Barcelona World Race.

Racing results

Gallery

References 

2000s sailing yachts
Sailing yachts designed by Farr Yacht Design
Sailing yachts designed by Bruce Farr
Sailboat types built in the United Kingdom
Vendée Globe boats
IMOCA 60